Henry Gilbert Costin (June 15, 1898 – October 8, 1918) was a private in the United States Army who received the Medal of Honor for his actions in World War I near Bois–de–Consenvoye, France during the Meuse–Argonne Offensive.

Biography
Private Costin was born June 15, 1898 in  Baltimore, Maryland, and graduated from the Baltimore City College high school in 1914. After enlisting in the Army in 1917, Costin fought in France in World War I. On October 8, 1918, near Bois–de–Consenvoye, Costin was killed while performing an act of extreme heroism, for which he was awarded the Medal of Honor, the United States' highest military commendation. His body lies buried in Loudon Park National Cemetery (section B, grave 460) in Baltimore, Maryland.

Medal of Honor citation

Rank and organization: Private, U.S. Army, Company H, 115th Infantry, 29th Division. Place and date: Near Bois–de–Consenvoye, France, 8 October 1918. Entered service at: Baltimore, Md. Birth: Baltimore, Md. G.O. No.: 34, W.D., 1919.

Citation:

When the advance of his platoon had been held up by machinegun fire and a request was made for an automatic rifle team to charge the nest, Pvt. Costin was the first to volunteer. Advancing with his team, under terrific fire of enemy artillery, machineguns, and trench mortars, he continued after all his comrades had become casualties and he himself had been seriously wounded. He operated his rifle until he collapsed. His act resulted in the capture of about 100 prisoners and several machineguns. He succumbed from the effects of his wounds shortly after the accomplishment of his heroic deed.

Namesake

The Liberty Ship SS Henry Gilbert Costin (Maritime Commission Hull Number 0950, U.S. Merchant Marine Association), built at the Bethlehem Shipyard in Baltimore in 1943, was named for Private Costin and used for troop transport during World War II.
Also named in honor of PVT Costin is the PVT Henry Costin National Guard Armory at 8601 Odell Road in 
Laurel, Maryland as well as the PVT Henry Costin Dining Facility on Omaha Beach Circle at the Camp Fretterd Military Reservation in Reisterstown, Maryland (Maryland Army National Guard).

See also

List of Medal of Honor recipients
List of Medal of Honor recipients for World War I

References
 

1898 births
1918 deaths
Military personnel from Baltimore
United States Army Medal of Honor recipients
United States Army soldiers
Baltimore City College alumni
American military personnel killed in World War I
World War I recipients of the Medal of Honor